New Market Ward is a ward located under Nagaland's capital city, Kohima. The ward falls under the designated Ward No. 8 of the Kohima Municipal Council.

Education
Educational Institutions in Daklane Ward:

Schools 
 Modern School
 New Market Government High School

See also
 Municipal Wards of Kohima

References

External links
 Map of Kohima Ward No. 8

Kohima
Wards of Kohima